The King's Trial is a 1990 Portuguese drama film directed by João Mário Grilo. The film was selected as the Portuguese entry for the Best Foreign Language Film at the 63rd Academy Awards, but was not accepted as a nominee.

Cast
 Carlos Daniel as D. Afonso VI
 Aurelle Doazan as D. Maria Francisca de Saboia
 Antonino Solmer as D. Pedro, Infante de Portugal
 Carlos Martins Medeiros as Count of Castelo-Melhor
 Gérard Hardy as Preyssac, Enviado de Luis XIV
 Muriel Brenner as Ninon

See also
 List of submissions to the 63rd Academy Awards for Best Foreign Language Film
 List of Portuguese submissions for the Academy Award for Best Foreign Language Film

References

External links

1990 films
1990 drama films
Portuguese drama films
1990s Portuguese-language films